Alma (minor planet designation: 390 Alma) is an asteroid from the intermediate asteroid belt, approximately 24 kilometers in diameter. It was Guillaume Bigourdan's only asteroid discovery. He discovered it on 24 March 1894 in Paris.

References

PDS Target Information

External links
 
 

Background asteroids
Alma
Alma
DT-type asteroids (Tholen)
18940324